Darin Hendrickson is an American college baseball coach who has been the head coach at Saint Louis since the start of the 2008 season.

Hendrickson has also served as the batting practice pitcher for the St. Louis Cardinals.

Playing career
Hendrickson pitched for two seasons (1990–1991) at his alma mater, SIU Edwardsville.  He was named First-Team All-Region both season and ranks among the school's leaders in career winning percentage, with an 18–5 (.783) overall record.

Coaching career
Following his graduation in 1992, Hendrickson served as an assistant at SIU Edwardsville for three seasons (1993–1995) while he earned his master's degree there.  He considered attending law school, but elected to stay in college coaching.

Fontbonne
Hendrickson's first head coaching position came at NCAA Division III Fontbonne, where he helped to start the Griffins' baseball program.  Hendrickson coached there for four seasons (1996–1999).  His best came in 1998, when the Griffins went 41–7 and won the SLIAC regular season and tournament championships to qualify for the NCAA Tournament.  At the Central Regional, Fontbonne went 0–2, losing 6–4 to North Central and 17–2 to Carthage.  Hendrickson was named both the 1998 SLIAC and Central Region Coach of the Year.

STLCC–Forest Park
From Fontbonne, Hendrickson moved to NJCAA Division II St. Louis Community College–Forest Park, where he served as both the athletic director and head baseball coach for four seasons (2000–2003).  Forest Park qualified for the NJCAA Tournament in each of his four seasons, reaching the NJCAA World Series in 2001.  That year, Hendrickson was named both District and MCCAC Coach of the Year.

Central Missouri
When Central Missouri State head coach Brad Hill left for Kansas State after the 2003 season, Hendrickson was hired to replace him.  At his introductory press conference, Hendrickson said, "The tradition is something I'm really looking forward to. Looking at their history, it is just amazing. I've only had an opportunity to view it from the outside. I am really excited to be a part of it now."

Hendrickson spent four seasons (2004–2007) at Central Missouri.  Under him, the Mules had three 50-win seasons and won three Mid-America Intercollegiate Athletics Association regular season and tournament titles each.  They appeared in the NCAA Tournament in all four of his seasons.  In 2004, the Mules swept through the Central Regional, defeating Wayne State (NE) 22–2 in the regional championship.  At the College World Series, the team lost its opener to Delta State but recovered to finish third.  In 2005, the Mules again swept through the Central Regional and finished third at the College World Series.  In 2006 and 2007, the program reached the NCAA Tournament but was eliminated in the Central Regional.  Hendrickson was named the MIAA Coach of the Year in 2004, 2005, and 2007.

In 2005, five Central Missouri pitchers were selected in the first 11 rounds of the MLB Draft.  These included second-round selection Nicholas Webber and tenth-round selection Josh Outman.  Outman, who had begun his career under Hendrickson at Forest Park and followed him to Central Missouri, went on to pitch in Major League Baseball.

Saint Louis
Hendrickson left Central Missouri for the head coaching position at Saint Louis ahead of the 2008 season.

After missing the A-10 Tournament in his first two seasons, the Billikens won it in 2010 to qualify for their first NCAA Tournament under Hendrickson.  At the Louisville Regional, Saint Louis went 0–2, losing games to host Louisville and Illinois State.

Saint Louis won three straight A-10 regular season titles in 2012, 2013, and 2014.  In 2012, Hendrickson was named the A-10 Coach of the Year.  In 2013, the team went 41–21 and also won the A-10 Tournament to qualify for another NCAA Tournament.  At the Columbia Regional, the Billikens lost both games, 7–3 to host South Carolina and 10–2 to second-seeded Clemson.

At Saint Louis, Hendrickson has had several major award winners and professional draftees.  Pitcher Alex Alemann won the 2010 A-10 Rookie of the Year Award, and first baseman Mike Vigliarolo was named the league's co-Player of the Year in 2013.  Between 2008–2014, Saint Louis has had eight MLB Draft selections under Hendrickson.  The number includes two top-ten round picks: catcher Grant Nelson, a ninth-round pick of the Arizona Diamondbacks in 2013, and pitcher James Norwood, a seventh-round pick of the Chicago Cubs in 2014.

Head coaching record
Below is a table of Hendrickson's yearly records as a collegiate head baseball coach.

See also
 List of current NCAA Division I baseball coaches
 Saint Louis Billikens

References

Living people
People from Granite City, Illinois
Central Missouri Mules baseball coaches
Fontbonne Griffins baseball coaches
STLCC Archers baseball coaches
Saint Louis Billikens baseball coaches
SIU Edwardsville Cougars baseball players
SIU Edwardsville Cougars baseball coaches
St. Louis Community College
Year of birth missing (living people)